Pascal Ovidy Manhanga (born 23 March 1991) is a Zimbabwean professional footballer, who plays as a midfielder for How Mine and the Zimbabwe national team. He is known for creating and scoring goals.

Career

Club
Manhanga started his career in the lower leagues of Zimbabwe, firstly with Mutare United and then with Tsholotsho Pirates, he remained with both sides for a year each before moving to Triangle United. He spent three years with Triangle Utd before he was signed by the 2013 Mbada Diamonds Cup winners Highlanders in June 2014. His stay with the Highlanders was short as he left to rejoin Triangle Utd at the start of 2015. However, a year later he was on the move again as he departed Triangle Utd for the second time to sign for How Mine.

International
In January 2014, coach Ian Gorowa, invited him to be a part of the Zimbabwe squad for the 2014 African Nations Championship. He helped the team to a fourth-place finish after being defeated by Nigeria by a goal to nil. He made two appearances in the aforementioned competition, overall he has played four times for Zimbabwe and scored one goal.

Career statistics

International
.

International goals
. Scores and results list Zimbabwe's goal tally first.

Personal life

Political views
Manhanga has criticized the widespread practice of polygamy in Zimbabwe, calling it worse for the people of his country than marijuana, pornography, or console video games.

References

Living people
1991 births
Zimbabwean footballers
Zimbabwe A' international footballers
2014 African Nations Championship players
How Mine F.C. players
Highlanders F.C. players
Association football midfielders
Zimbabwe international footballers